Charles R. Wira  is a scientist who is specialized in endocrinology and mucosal immunology. His research specifically focuses on the immune system at mucosal surfaces of the female reproductive tract.

Wira received his B.S. in 1962 in Animal Husbandry from Delaware Valley College (now Delaware Valley University), Doylestown, PA and his M.S. in Physiology from Michigan State University in 1966. Wira moved to Dartmouth College in 1966, where he received his Ph.D. in 1970. From 1970 to 1972 he did his postdoctoral training at the University of Paris, France, studying molecular mechanism of estrogen action in the uterus. He returned to Dartmouth as an Assistant Professor in the Department of Physiology and was promoted to professor in 1985.

His research focuses on how female sex hormones influence innate and adaptive immunity in the female reproductive tract of animal models and humans. He has been Principal investigator of NIH-funded research grant for the past 35 years, having published approximately 240 research papers in this area. Wira was actively involved in a Dartmouth Medical School Fogarty Grant that worked with colleagues at Dartmouth and the University of Muhimbili, Tanzania to bring scientists to Dartmouth for training in HIV-related mucosal immunology. Wira's laboratory includes graduate students and research associates from the United States, China, India, Tanzania, Kenya, Zimbabwe, and Australia.

Wira is a member of the Society for Mucosal Immunology, American Society for Reproductive Immunology (ASRI), American Society for Microbiology, and the International Society for Immunology of Reproduction (ISIR). He was the President of ASRI (2008–2010) and is currently the President of ISIR (2015–2017). He has received numerous awards, including an NIH MERIT Award and the ASRI Distinguished Investigator Award in Reproductive Immunology. Wira is an advisor to NIH, including NIH Women, Girls, and HIV/AIDS Group, NIH Planning Group for HIV-related research; Women and Girls Planning Group; and the OAR Microbicides Planning Group. He has worked with NIH to organize international meetings sponsored by the National Institute of Allergy and Infectious Diseases on prevention of HIV transmission and mucosal immunity in the male and female reproductive tract in Hanover, NH.

Wira has been an advisor to NIH for numerous conferences, including National Institutes of Child Health and Human Development: Conference on Maternal/Fetal placental Interactions in Washington, DC; NIH Microbicide Meeting in Atlanta, Go; Syphilis Conference of NIH in Memphis TN; The Biology of HIV Transmission Think Tank, NIH in Washington, DC; NIH AIDS Women, Girls and HIV Conference in Washington, DC; National Institutes of Health Fertility Regulation and Systemic Hormones in HIV-infected and at-risk Women in Washington, DC; NIH Planning Group for HIV-related research; Woman and Girls Planning Group; and the NIH Plan for HIV-related research; OAR: Microbicides Planning Group.

References

Living people
American endocrinologists
Dartmouth College faculty
American physiologists
Dartmouth College alumni
Wira, Charles
Year of birth missing (living people)
Place of birth missing (living people)